The blue-headed forest skink (Sphenomorphus cyanolaemus) is a species of skink. It is found in Borneo, Peninsular Malaysia, and Sumatra (including some nearby islands).

References

cyanolaemus
Reptiles of Brunei
Reptiles of Indonesia
Reptiles of Malaysia
Reptiles of Borneo
Reptiles described in 1965
Taxa named by Robert F. Inger
Taxa named by William Hosmer (herpetologist)